The caretaker government of Myanmar, officially the Provisional Government of the Republic of the Union of Myanmar, is the executive body of Myanmar under the current military junta, the State Administration Council. On 1 August 2021, it replaced the Management Committee of the State Administration Council, which had been in place since 19 February 2021, following the 2021 Myanmar coup d'état. Some ministers were appointed by Min Aung Hlaing immediately following the coup on 1 February, in his capacity as Commander-in-Chief of Defence Services exercising emergency powers.

Due to the state of emergency, the cabinet is led by Prime Minister Min Aung Hlaing rather than Acting President Myint Swe, despite the president being the constitutional head of government.

Background
The 2021 coup came in the aftermath of the general election on 8 November 2020, in which the National League for Democracy won 396 out of 476 seats in parliament, an even larger margin of victory compared to that in the 2015 election. The military's proxy party, the Union Solidarity and Development Party, won only 33 seats.

The army disputed the results, claiming that the vote was fraudulent. The coup attempt had been rumored for several days, prompting statements of concern from Western powers such as France, the United States, and Australia.

On the morning of 1 February 2021, President Win Myint, State Counsellor Aung San Suu Kyi, as well as several Union Ministers, State and Region Chief Ministers, State and Region Ministers, and elected MPs, were detained by the military. Since then, the State Administration Council has governed the country. The military deposed the elected civilian government and General Min Aung Hlaing, the commander-in-chief of Defence Services, announced the formation of a caretaker government with himself as prime minister and extended military rule through 2023, state media reported on 1 August 2021.

This caretaker government is the second in Burmese history since independence.

Members 
The Provisional Government comprises the following persons:
 State Prime Minister (also serves as the Chairman of the State Administration Council)
 Deputy Prime Minister (also serves as the Vice-Chairman of the State Administration Council)
 Union Ministers (29 ministers, as of 1 September 2021)
 Attorney General of the Union (also serves as the Union Minister for Legal Affairs),
 Permanent Secretary, Office of the Provisional Government

Head and deputy head

Cabinet

References 

Government of Myanmar
Military dictatorship in Myanmar
Politicide perpetrators
Military history of Myanmar
2020s in Myanmar
2021 in military history
2021 establishments in Myanmar
Provisional governments